Djibo Bakary (1922 – 16 April 1998) was a socialist politician and important figure in the independence movement of Niger. Bakary was the first Nigerien to hold local executive power since the beginning of French colonialism. From 20 May 1957 to 14 December 1958, Bakary held the position of Vice President of the Council of Government and from 26 July 1958 to 10 October 1958, Bakary was the President of the Government Council of Niger.  He was replaced by his cousin Diori Hamani, who eventually led Niger to independence in 1960.

External links
Bakary in Britannica
World Statesmen- Niger
Nigerdiaspora.net - Remembering of the death of Djibo Bakary every year on April 16 (in French)

1922 births
1998 deaths
Nigerien independence activists
People of French West Africa
Nigerien socialists